Ammophilinae is a subfamily of thread-waisted wasps in the family Sphecidae. There are about 6 genera and more than 320 described species in Ammophilinae.

Genera
These six genera belong to the subfamily Ammophilinae:
 Ammophila W. Kirby, 1798
 Eremnophila Menke, 1964
 Eremochares Gribodo, 1883
 Hoplammophila de Beaumont, 1960
 Parapsammophila Taschenberg, 1869
 Podalonia Fernald, 1927 (cutworm wasps)

References

External links

 

Sphecidae
Apocrita subfamilies